Aristolochia fimbriata is a species of perennial plant in the family Aristolochiaceae. It is found in Brazil, Paraguay, Bolivia, Uruguay, and Argentina.
The flowering plant attracts butterflies and is known for its traditional medicinal properties.

References

External links

fimbriata
Plants described in 1832